Marcos may refer to:

People with the given name Marcos
Marcos (given name)

Sports
Surnamed
 Dayton Marcos, Negro league baseball team from Dayton, Ohio (early twentieth-century)
 Dimitris Markos, Greek footballer
 Nélson Marcos, Portuguese footballer
 Randa Markos,  Iraqi-Canadian female mixed martial artist
Nicknamed
 Marcos Joaquim dos Santos (born 1975), Brazilian footballer known as Marcos
 Marcos de Paula (born 1983), Brazilian footballer known as Marcos playing for A.C. ChievoVerona
 Marcos Alonso Peña (born 1959), Spanish footballer known as Marcos
Named
 Marcos Ambrose, Australian racing driver currently competing in NASCAR
 Marcos Baghdatis, Cypriot tennis player
 Marcos Hernández (swimmer), Cuban freestyle swimmer
 Marcos Pizzelli, Brazilian-Armenian footballer
 Marcos (footballer, born 1973), Brazilian football goalkeeper
 Marcos García Barreno, Spanish footballer
 Marcos Mazzaron, Brazilian cyclist
 Marcos Carneiro de Mendonça (1894–1988), first goalkeeper of the Brazil national team, later president of Fluminense FC
 Marcos do Nascimento Teixeira, Brazilian footballer, known as Marcão

Politics
 Ferdinand Marcos (1917–1989), 10th President of the Philippines (1965–1986)
 Bongbong Marcos, former senator and former Representative of Ilocos Norte, 17th President of the Philippines (2022-)
 Imelda Marcos (born 1929), former First Lady and powerful political figure in the Philippines
 Imee Marcos, current senator 
 Irene Marcos-Araneta, the daughter of Ferdinand and Imelda Marcos
 Matthew Marcos Manotoc, son of Imee
 Mariano Marcos, lawyer and politician in Ilocos Norte, Philippines
 Michael Marcos Keon, nephew of Ferdinand
 Pacífico Marcos, younger brother of Ferdinand
 Subcomandante Marcos, also known as Delegate Zero, spokesperson for the Zapatista Army of National Liberation
 Rabban Marcos, 13th-century cleric later elected as the Nestorian patriarch, Mar Yaballaha III
 Markos Moulitsas, owner of the largest political blog in the US, Daily Kos

Geography
 Marcos, Ilocos Norte, Philippines
 Marcos Castellanos
 San Marcos, Antioquia
 San Marcos, Baja California Sur
 San Marcos, California
 San Marcos, Costa Rica
 San Marcos, Guatemala
 San Marcos, Guerrero
 San Marcos, Nicaragua
 San Marcos, Texas
 San Marcos (department)
 Márkos, the Hungarian name for Mărcuş village, Dobârlău Commune, Covasna County, Romania

Automobiles

 Marcos (automobile), British sportscar manufacturer
 Marcos Mantis GT, sports car
 Mini Marcos,

Military

 USS San Marcos (LSD-25), Casa Grande-class dock landing ship
 MARCOS, India's elite marine commando force

Television and film
 Lisa Marcos, Canadian actress
 Niurka Marcos, Cuban-Mexican singer, dancer and actress
 Marcos A. Rodriguez, Cuban-American businessman
 K. G. Markose, Indian Playback singer

Art
 Lajos Markos, painter
 Pablo Marcos, artist

Education

 San Marcos High School (Santa Barbara, California), public high school located in the California central coast city of Santa Barbara
 Mariano Marcos State University, public university in Ilocos Norte, Philippines

Other

 Pacífico Marcos, former president of the Philippine Medical Association
 Marco's Pizza

Masculine given names